Moisés García León (born 10 July 1971), known simply as Moisés, is a Spanish former footballer who played as a centre-forward.

In a 21-year professional career (23 seasons in total) he played for 13 teams – including Zaragoza, Celta, Villarreal and Sevilla in La Liga – amassing totals of 524 games and 151 goals, 163 matches and 40 goals being in the top flight.

Playing career
A product of hometown Real Zaragoza's youth system, Moisés was born in Seville, Andalusia, and raised in La Rioja. He was only 17 when he made his debut with the first team on 6 November 1988 in a 2–1 home win against Real Murcia, being the youngest player to ever appear in La Liga for the club; however, he could never break into the starting XI.

After two and a half seasons in the Segunda División, with CA Osasuna and CD Leganés, Moisés returned to the top flight with RC Celta de Vigo, but featured sparingly during his spell in Galicia. In 1999–2000, he was instrumental in helping Villarreal CF return to the latter competition as he scored 17 goals, joint-second best in the competition. 

Moisés managed to stay in the Spanish top flight until December 2002, receiving relative playing time with both Villarreal and Sevilla FC. From there onwards he resumed his career solely in division two, with very good scoring records (in 2008–09, at already 37, his goals proved crucial in the campaign's final stretch, as Gimnàstic de Tarragona finally escaped the relegation zone).

Aged 39, Moisés signed with amateurs CD La Muela, promoted to the Segunda División B for the first time ever, thus returning to his native region after a two-decade absence.

Coaching career
After La Muela's immediate relegation, Moisés retired from football and returned to former club SD Huesca, joining Quique Hernández's coaching staff early into the season as the pair helped the team finally retain their second division status.

On 22 October 2012, in the same capacity and also in division two, he joined Hércules CF and reunited with Hernández, who had been appointed following the dismissal of Juan Carlos Mandiá.

Personal life
Moisés' brothers, Eduardo, Gerardo and Manuel, were also professional footballers. The second, a defender, represented most notably Málaga CF.

Honours
Zaragoza
Copa del Rey: 1993–94

References

External links

1971 births
Living people
Spanish footballers
Footballers from Andalusia
Association football forwards
La Liga players
Segunda División players
Segunda División B players
Real Zaragoza B players
Real Zaragoza players
CA Osasuna players
CD Leganés players
RC Celta de Vigo players
Villarreal CF players
Sevilla FC players
Córdoba CF players
Elche CF players
Hércules CF players
Polideportivo Ejido footballers
Gimnàstic de Tarragona footballers
SD Huesca footballers
CD La Muela players
Spain youth international footballers